Oliver M. Olson was an American football, basketball, track, and cross country coach.  He served as the head football coach at Macalester College (1939–1942), Black Hills Teachers College—now known as Black Hills State University (1946–1947), Beloit College (1948–1949), Augustana College in Rock Island, Illinois (1950), and West Liberty University (1957–1958). Olson was also the head basketball coach Augustana during the 1950–51 season and at West Liberty, serving two stints (1953–1957) and (1959–1964), leading his team to one West Virginia Intercollegiate Athletic Conference (WVIAC) regular season championship (1961) and three conference tournament titles (1952, 1957, 1960).

Olson played college football at Northwestern University, lettering in 1931, 1932, and 1933.  He also ran track at Northwestern. Olson was the head track coach and an assistant football coach for three seasons at Carlton College before he was hired at Macalester. He is a member of both the Black Hills State Hall of Fame (inducted in 1985) and the West Liberty State Hall of Fame (inducted in 1982).

Head coaching record

Football

References

External links
 Black Hills State Hall of Fame profile
 West Liberty State Hall of Fame profile

Year of birth missing
Year of death missing
American  football placekickers
Augustana (Illinois) Vikings football coaches
Augustana (Illinois) Vikings men's basketball coaches
Beloit Buccaneers football coaches
Black Hills State Yellow Jackets football coaches
Black Hills State Yellow Jackets men's basketball coaches
Boston University Terriers football coaches
Boston University Terriers track and field coaches
Carleton Knights football coaches
Macalester Scots football coaches
Northwestern Wildcats football players
Northwestern Wildcats men's track and field athletes
Regis Rangers men's basketball coaches
West Liberty Hilltoppers football coaches
West Liberty Hilltoppers men's basketball coaches
Basketball coaches from Illinois
College cross country coaches in the United States
College men's basketball head coaches in the United States
Sportspeople from Wheaton, Illinois
Players of American football from Illinois
Track and field athletes from Illinois